Balakan (also Romanized as Balakān and Balūkān) is a village in Dastjerd Rural District, Alamut-e Gharbi District, Qazvin County, Qazvin Province, Iran. At the 2006 census, its population was 72, in 26 families.

References 

Populated places in Qazvin County